Raja Babu or Rajababu may refer to:
 Raja Babu (actor) (1937–1983), Indian actor
 Raja Babu (film), 1994 Hindi film
 Rajababu (film), a 2006 film directed by Muppalaneni Shiva